Circumarctic Environmental Observatories Network (CEON) is a network of terrestrial and freshwater observation platforms, science experts and network partners promoting the collection and dissemination of environmental data from the Arctic.
CEON observation platforms include land and freshwater observatories, research infrastructures, former research sites where retrospective analyses are being or can be undertaken, data and image archive centers and community monitoring programs.

Background 

The concept of initiating a CEON was first raised at a meeting of the Forum of Arctic research Operators (FARO) at Arctic Science Summit Week (ASSW) in 2000 by Tom Pyle (US representative to FARO). Members of FARO endorsed the CEON concept specifying that CEON is to promote environmental observations in the Arctic and dissemination of these to Arctic researchers whilst encompassing and building on the strengths of existing stations and environmental observatory networks active in the Arctic.

In June 2002 Tom Pyle, head of Arctic Section of the Office of Polar Programs within the National Science Foundation of the United States tasked Patrick Webber (President of the International Arctic Science Committee - IASC), and Craig Tweedie (then at Michigan State University) with scoping and developing the CEON concept.

Development 

The initial development of CEON was based on the notion that early successes will be met by facilitating the activities of existing environmental sites and networks active in the Arctic and increasing the potential for integration and syntheses between sites. Example activities include promoting increased transfer of knowledge and standardization of research methods between networks and sites, and increasing accessibility to data and linkages to multidisciplinary and international programs.

Accordingly, presentations on the CEON concept were made at numerous meetings of organizations/research programs active in the Arctic over a short period of time in order to establish an initial momentum for the development of CEON. Presentations focused on the necessity for the CEON initiative to meet the needs of the participating research community, science administrators, policy makers, industry, education and indigenous communities whilst providing linkages between disciplines and existing networks and connectivity spanning regional to circum-arctic and global scales.

Approach 

Deliberately, presentations of the CEON concept have made no mention or suggestion of measurements or processes that should or could be made or investigated. Instead, observers have been asked to introduce their own bias into the development of CEON by providing feedback to the following question: "What would you do if you had the opportunity to conduct/maintain standardized and integrated time series observations across multiple research stations and networks in the Arctic?" This 'bottom-up' approach has facilitated the development and scoping of CEON based on the experience, needs and future directions envisaged by a broad range of potential CEON stakeholder and user groups.

Mission 

CEON's mission is to strengthen the capacity for emerging monitoring, research and policy needs at high northern latitudes by making data available that is adequate and suitable for answering and addressing a series of well-defined key scientific questions and uncertainties.

Rationale 

The CEON stakeholder community has developed the following rationale that underpins development of CEON:

 Relative to other regions on the globe, the Arctic is experiencing dramatic changes in climate and patterns of human land use. Environmental and socioeconomic drivers associated with these changes originate both within and outside of the Arctic system.
 Change detection & predictive power of these changes is low and are limited/ threatened by the lack of sustained environmental observation time series in northern high latitudes.
 A circum-arctic environmental observatories network that can provide adequate, diverse and sustained time series observations has the potential to dramatically improve our understanding of the Arctic system and how it may continue to respond to a variety of environmental and societal changes forecast for the region.
 There is a well-established science infrastructure and a tremendous amount of research and monitoring ongoing in the Arctic. Generally, the broader international and multidisciplinary impacts of these efforts are not fully tapped due to limitations associated with research exposure, communication, data availability, and differences in technologies and sampling methods between sites. Reinforcing and improving the broader impacts of existing and planned activities is the primary focus of CEON at present.

Goals 

Through collaboration with its partners and the development of novel cyberinfrastructure, CEON aims to provide and facilitate:

 Access to data and information.
 Access to facilities.
 Mobility of researchers.
 Adequate coverage of common and standardized observations.
 Adequate coverage of regional observatories.
 Up-scaling of site specific observations.
 Support for circum-arctic, regional, thematic and global research and observing programs.
 Parameterization and validation of models and remote sensing.
 Exploitation of data archives, proxies and re-occupation of abandoned sites.
 Rapid responses to environmental emergencies.
 Development and testing of methodologies and sensors.
 Testing and development of ecological (and other disciplinary) theory.
 Education and communication.

Structure 

At present, CEON is being co-chaired by Terry Callaghan (Abisko Scientific Research Station, Sweden) and Craig Tweedie (University of Texas at El Paso, United States). Terry and Craig oversee CEON's two Science Coordination Offices:

 EUSCO ~ CEON's European Science Coordination Office.
 NASCO ~ CEON's North American Science Coordination Office.

As CEON transitions from an initiation phase of development to an implementational phase, EUSCO and NASCO are focused on developing an improved organizational structure for CEON in consultation with the CEON stakeholder community.
EUSCO ~ CEON's European Science Coordination Office

EUSCO's primary role is to:

 Liaise with NASCO.
 Oversee primary CEON communications with European stakeholders and key partners in Eurasia.
 Produce and catalogue georeferenced files of past, present and developing Arctic research sites and observatory platforms in Europe and the observational protocols employed at each.
 Identify new technologies, protocols and networks being utilized in Europe for environmental monitoring that could be relevant to other CEON observatory platforms.
 Represent CEON at international and European meetings.
 Collaborate with NASCO to compile meeting reports and other publications as necessary,
 Facilitate the planning and convention of CEON meetings.

NASCO ~ CEON's North American Science Coordination Office

NASCO's primary role is to:

 Liaise with EUSCO.
 Oversee primary CEON communications with North American and discipline-based Stakeholders.
 Represent CEON at international and North American meetings.
 Focus efforts associated with community liaison within North America and with key partners in Eurasia.
 Provide overall network coordination and communication by
 Liaising with CEON stakeholder groups,
 Maintaining the primary CEON web site,
 Designing and producing brochures, posters and power point presentations that describe and promote CEON,
 Producing reports and publications related to CEON meetings and workshops,
 Managing the NASCO budget,
 Oversee the organization and convention of CEON meetings by advertising meetings to key partner groups and organizing meeting venues, lodging and travel for participants,
 Oversee the primary development, management and training associated with the various web-based mapping and informational tools CEON has developed.

Current Activities 

 Transitioning from an implementation phase to becoming a fully implemented multi-laterally funded international network.
 Developing documentation that formally identifies the network, its mission, objectives, scope and mode of operation.
 Developing mechanisms and cyberinfrastructure for enhancing information transfer both within and external to CEON.
 Liaising with CEON stakeholders and reviewing current monitoring efforts and capacities at a circumarctic scale to identify partnerships, locations, mechanisms and technologies that could be implemented to reduce observational gaps in the Arctic.

Maps and portals 

Web-based Mapping application development has been a key focus of CEON's activities over the past few years. Interactive web-based mapping applications (also called internet map servers) allow users to view a range of thematic map and satellite image layers, query a range of spatially explicit research and site data including sites affiliated with several international or national environmental observing networks or programs. Perhaps most importantly for CEON, users can glean an assortment of information in a single portal and then link to CEON's partnering networks to access more detailed or explicit information.

CEON has built several types of web-based mapping systems including:

 A Circumarctic Internet Map Server (CEON-IMS).
 A 3D Geobrowswer allowing Google Earth-like interactivity with CEON's geospatial information.
 We have also worked with colleagues to facilitate the development of several regional web-based mapping applications and several goal-specific circumarctic web-based mapping applications.

CEON Internet Map Server (IMS) 

The CEON - Internet Map Server (CEON-IMS) has been developed to enable and enhance the visualization and search-ability of a geo-database composed of observational platforms and information sources compatible with CEON's mission. CEON-IMS includes over 175 layers of remote sensing products, maps, and information on historical and current research efforts - all of which are associated with environmental observations in the Arctic.

This information can be used freely by researchers, land managers, educators, policy makers and local communities to access spatial data and information on primarily terrestrial and freshwater research in the Arctic. The information in this application is linked to online references and other information sources hosted by data providers.

CEON-IMS has been developed by the Systems Ecology Laboratory (SEL) at the University of Texas at El Paso (UTEP) and Nuna Technologies under several proposals sponsored by the Office of Polar Programs (OPP) at the US National Science Foundation (NSF).

CEON 3D (Geobrowser)

CEON 3D is a prototype application developed with ESRI's free ArcGIS Explorer virtual globe software that is somewhat similar to Google Earth. User's can use this tool to fly to areas of interest and explore networks partnered to CEON. CEON 3D can also be used to print jpg images. CEON 3D also gives the user the ability to import maps, satellite imagery, GPS, Google Earth's kml data format and other data and view these raster or vector (points, lines and polygons) data alongside other CEON data. Importation of data is possible from the users' desktop, local area network, or external drive as well as from various web services (including real time data, satellite archives, data layers from other internet map servers etc.).

Sponsors 
Many participants involved in the development of CEON have generously provided whole or partial funding to support their attendance at meetings and participation in drafting of CEON documentation.

 The US National Science Foundation
 The Royal Swedish Academy of Sciences' Abisko Scientific Research Station.
 The Scandinavian-North European Network of Terrestrial Field Bases (SCANNET).
 A grant to Abisko Scientific Research Station from the Swedish Environmental Protection Agency for its participation in the Arctic Climate Impact Assessment (ACIA).

Endorsements 

The following key organizations have formally endorsed the concept of CEON:

 IASC
 FARO
 Senior Arctic Officials of the Arctic Council

External links 
Circumarctic Environmental Observatories Network

References 
 The terrestrial Circumarctic Environmental Observatories Network

Environment of the Arctic
Arctic research